For lists of islands of Western Australia, please see:
List of islands of Western Australia, 0–9, A–C
Islands of Lake Argyle
List of islands of Western Australia, D–G
List of islands of Western Australia, H–L
List of islands of Western Australia, M–Q
List of islands of Western Australia, R–T
List of islands of Western Australia, U–Z
Sortable list of islands of Western Australia

See also

Coastal regions of Western Australia
List of islands of Australia
Islands of Perth, Western Australia

 List